Thourion may refer to:
Mount Thourion, a mountain in ancient central Greece
Thourion (Acarnania), a city in ancient Acarnania, in northwestern Greece